Jeżewski is a surname. Notable people with the surname include:

 Alfons Jeżewski (1914–1983), Polish sprint canoer
 Christophe Jeżewski (born 1939), Polish poet, musicologist, essayist, and translator

Polish-language surnames